Midland Regional Hospital may refer to various hospitals in Ireland:

Midland Regional Hospital, Mullingar
Midland Regional Hospital, Portlaoise
Midland Regional Hospital, Tullamore